A hexagraph (from the , héx, "six" and γράφω, gráphō, "write") is a sequence of six letters used to represent a single sound (phoneme), or a combination of sounds that do not correspond to the individual values of the letters. However, not all Irish hexagraphs are analysable that way. The hexagraph , for example, represents the same sound (approximately the vowel in English "write") as the trigraph adh, and with the same effect on neighboring consonants. 

English does not have hexagraphs. The six-letter sequence  appears in German, for example in the name Eschscholtz (and thus is the scientific name Eschscholtzia of the California poppy), but this is a doubling of the trigraph  to indicate that the preceding vowel is short rather than itself being a hexagraph.

List of hexagraphs

Irish hexagraphs 
 is used to write  ( in Ulster), e.g.  "sortie",  "haste, skirmish",  "improvement",  "books",  "minds".

 is used to write  ( in Ulster), e.g.  "troop",  "Gormley" (surname),  "struck".

 is used to write , e.g.  "garlic",  "I bark",  "semiology",  "slippery",  "tor, hill".

"ivy",  "penniless",  "healing",  "soft toys",  "will divide".

"fates",  "scourage",  "cormorant",  "oven",  "ice",  "(snail)shell".

 is used to write , e.g.  "foggy" (gen.).

 is used to write , e.g.  "edge".

See also
Multigraph
Digraph
Pentagraph
Heptagraph
List of Latin-script letters

6
Latin-script hexagraphs